Edward Owen Eustace Hill (30 March 1907 – 2001) was an English-born New Zealand politician who served as the 18th Mayor of New Plymouth.

Biography

Early life
Hill was born in Bristol in 1907 into a traditional shipping family and was later to become a director of the Bristol City line of steamships, trading between South Wales ports and North America until he became a parson. Hill was educated at Oxford University where he graduated with a Master of Arts degree in history. While at Oxford he was involved with the Christian movement the Oxford Group (Buchmanites). He then worked in a legal office until joining the Army during World War II serving for most of the war as a staff officer at Western Command headquarters.

He later moved to New Zealand with his wife, Jean, and daughters, Rowena, Beatrice and Theodora in 1946 where he became an Anglican clergyman in Canterbury and later Taranaki.

Political career
Hill was elected Mayor of New Plymouth in 1953 succeeding the long serving Everard Gilmour who had been Mayor for two decades. Hill was the first to run against Gilmour since 1933 and defeated both him and two other candidates for the position. He served only one term as Mayor and was defeated by Alf Honnor 4181 votes to 2675 in 1956. Despite losing the mayoralty Hill won a seat on the council that year serving a further term on the New Plymouth Borough Council.

Hill was considered then to be the most "unlikely" mayor in New Plymouth's history because he was an outsider, having lived in the city for only two years and had no previous civic experience. Hill later recalled that his most satisfying projects as mayor had been helping to build pensioner flats, and the construction of the War Memorial Hall building. Hill also welcomed Queen Elizabeth II on New Plymouth's behalf during her Royal Tour in 1954.

He later moved back to Britain briefly but returned to New Zealand and settled in Wellington as a union secretary. He later became the chairman of both the Kelburn Progressive Association and Wellington State House Committee and was also involved with the British Sailors' Society and New Zealand Scenery Preservation Society. In 1966 he was elected the President of the Wellington Labour Representation Committee. He stood several times for the Wellington City Council as a Labour candidate in 1965, 1968 and a 1969 by-election. While generally polling well he never won a seat.

Death
Hill died in Wellington in 2001.

Personal life
Hill's first marriage was to Jean O'Hagan Morton, an author who published three novels and a collection of writings all under the name Jean O. Hill. They had three daughters, Rowena, Beatrice and Theodora. His daughter Beatrice Tinsley had a notable career as an astronomer and cosmologist in the United States, where she was renowned as one of the world's greatest astrophysicists, but died prematurely in 1981 at the age of 40. After his first wife's death he remarried to Mattie Hill.

References

External links

1907 births
2001 deaths
English emigrants to New Zealand
People from New Plymouth
Mayors of New Plymouth
New Zealand Labour Party politicians
20th-century New Zealand politicians
New Zealand military personnel of World War II